Apurva Motiwale is an Indian Editor, Who works in Hindi, Marathi and Telugu cinema. As a frequent collaborator with Ashish Mhatre, she has edited more than 40 films. Her first film as an editor was  Ajab Lagnachi Gajab Goshta (2010).

Career
Apurva started her career as an assistant editor with the films Mumbai Meri Jaan in 2008, Harishchandrachi Factory in 2009 and Chillar Party 2011. She edited milestone films like Duniyadari, Ye Re Ye Re Paisa (2018). She received MICTA, International Marathi Film Festival Awards and Sanskruti Kala Darpan Awards for best editing for the film Duniyadari, and the Zee Marathi Gaurav Award for Ye Re Ye Re Paisa (2018).

Awards

Filmography

Marathi
 Ajab Lagnachi Gajab Gosth
 Zakaas 
 Sanshay Kallol
 Duniyadari
 Vakratund Mahakay 
 Pyar Wali Love Story 
 Lokmanya Ek Yug Purush 
 Balkadu 
 Kaakan 
 Online Binline 
 TuHiRe 
 Katyar Kaljat Ghusali
 Guru 
 One Way Ticket 
 Vithhala Shappath 
 Chaand Priticha 
  Ye Re Ye Re Paisa 
 Lagn Mubarak 
 Pushpak Viman
 Ani Dr Kashinath Ghanekar 
 Thackeray 
 Sarv Line Vyast Ahet 
 Mi Pan Sachin 
 Luckee
 Surr Sapata 
 15 August
 Khari Biscuit

Hindi
 Thackeray
 Mastram
 Luv Shuv Tey Chicken Khurana
 Purani Jeans
Adipurush

Telugu 

 Adipurush

Short Film
 Quarter by Navjyot Bandiwadekar
 Anekant 
 Adnyat 
 Dry Dreams 
 Fuddu Boys 
 Mohan Mutton

References

External links
 

1985 births
Living people
Hindi film editors
Marathi film editors
Indian film editors
People from Indore
Telugu film editors